Anti-British sentiment is prejudice, persecution, discrimination, fear or hatred against the British Government, British people, or the culture of the United Kingdom.

Argentina
Anti-British feeling in Argentina originates mainly from two causes.

The first and older cause was the intervention of British capital and companies together with their disproportional political influence. This political influence is associated with the local oligarchy and its economic model based on the primary sector and commodities. In turn, this led to controversial actions by successive Argentine governments such as the Roca–Runciman Treaty and the Treaty of Madrid (1989).

The second one is the Falkland Islands sovereignty dispute and the Falklands War in 1982 between Argentina and the United Kingdom. Due to this, anti-British and acts of vandalism do erupt.

Germany

Gott strafe England was an anti-British slogan used by the German Army during World War I. The phrase literally means "May God punish England". In 1946, in Hamburg, "Ausgebombte" (bombed-out refugees) demonstrators sang the song.

India

In India, Pakistan and Bangladesh, the Indian independence movement encouraged this sentiment, which was borne out of opposition against British colonial and imperial activities in these countries, called British Raj.

Iran

Anti-British sentiment, sometimes described as Anglophobia, has been described as "deeply entrenched in Iranian culture", and reported to be increasingly prevalent in Iran. In July 2009, an adviser to Ayatollah Ali Khamenei called Britain "worse than America" for its alleged interference in Iran's post-election affairs.  In the first half of the 20th century, the British Empire exerted political influence over Iran (Persia) in order to control the profits from the Anglo-Persian Oil Company. As a result, British influence was widely known to have been behind the overthrow of the Qajar dynasty in the 1920s, the subsequent rise of Reza Shah Pahlavi, and the successful coup d'état overthrowing prime minister Mohammad Mosaddeq in 1953.

On Monday 9 August 2010, the senior Iranian minister and Iran's first vice president Mohammad Reza Rahimi declared that the British people were "stupid" and "not human". His remarks drew criticism from Simon Gass, the British ambassador in Iran, and also from the media in Britain.

In November 2011 the Iranian parliament voted to downgrade relations with the UK after British sanctions were imposed on Iran due to its nuclear programme. Politicians reportedly shouted "Death to Britain". On 29 November 2011, Iranian students in Tehran stormed the British embassy, ransacked offices, smashed windows, shouted "Death to England[sic]" and burned the British flag.

Parts of the Iranian media campaigned against the reopening of the British Embassy in Tehran in August 2015, referring to Britain as an "old fox " – a term popularised by the Pakistani writer Seyyed Ahmad Adib Pishavari (born Peshawar 1844, died Tehran 1930) – and accusing Britain of having provoked protests against the re-election of Mahmoud Ahmadinejad in 2009.

Ireland

There is a long tradition of anti-British sentiment, specifically anti-English sentiment since the Anglo-Norman invasion of Ireland and often more specifically Anglophobia, within Irish nationalism. Much of this was grounded in the hostility felt by the largely Catholic poor for the Anglo-Irish gentry, which was mainly Anglican.  This however may occlude the reality that during the Peninsular War against Napoleon, thirty percent of Wellington's army had been Irish.  This figure rose steadily over the following decades.  By 1831, forty percent of the British Army were Irish.  By the 1860s, the number peaked at sixty percent claiming to be either Irish born or of Irish descent.  The number then gradually reduced until by the Boer War, twenty per cent of Britain's fighting men were Irish.  By 1914, the British Army numbered 247,000 troops, of whom 20,000 were Irish with a further 145,000 ex-regular reserves...30,000 of which were Irish meaning that in 1914, Irishmen made up twelve percent of the total British Army.  ....Approximately 50,000 Irish soldiers died in the First World War.   During World War 2, an estimated 70,000 citizens of neutral Ireland served in the British Armed Forces, together with 50,000 or so from Northern Ireland. 7,500 of these lost their lives in service. Virtually all who served were volunteers.  In Southern Ireland at least, decisions to volunteer and serve were mainly individual.  In post-famine Ireland, anti-English hostility was adopted into the philosophy and foundation of the Irish nationalist movement. At the turn of the twentieth century, the Celtic Revival movement associated the search for a cultural and national identity with increasing anti-colonial and anti-English sentiment.

A feeling of anti-English sentiment intensified within Irish nationalism during the Boer War leading to xenophobia underlined by Anglophobia. In 2011, tensions and anti-English or anti-British feelings flared in relation to the proposed state visit of Queen Elizabeth II, the first British monarch to visit Ireland in 100 years. A republican demonstration was held at the GPO Dublin by a group of Irish Republicans on 26 February 2011, and a mock trial and decapitation of an effigy of Queen Elizabeth II were carried out by republican group Éirígí. Other protests included a Dublin publican hanging a banner declaring "She and her family are all officially barred from this pub as long as the British occupy one inch of this island they will never be welcome in Ireland" during her visit. Following the announcement of Queen Elizabeth II's death on 8 September 2022, a video of Shamrock Rovers fans chanting "Lizzie's in a box, in a box, Lizzie's in a box!" to the tune of KC and the Sunshine Band's "Give It Up" at a UEFA Europa Conference League group stage match in Dublin circulated on social media.

Israel

The relationship between Israel and the UK is generally regarded as close and warm, and as a strategic partnership of the two nations. According to the a BBC World Service poll in 2014, five in ten Israelis (50%) have favourable attitudes to the UK, and only 6% of Israelis hold negative views towards the UK, the second lowest percentage after Japan.

Occasional criticism is also found. In Israel, anti-British sentiment may historically stem from British rule and policies in the mandate era, and in modern times from the perceived anti-Israel stance of the British media.

The Jewish population of the United Kingdom was recorded as being 269,568 in the 2011 Census. Reacting to 609 anti-Semitic incidents across the UK in the first half of 2009, and to the announcement of numerous UK organizations to impose a boycott on Israel, some Israelis claimed that the UK is anti-Israeli and Antisemitic. According to an opinion piece by Eytan Gilboa, "the British media systematically supports the Palestinians, and openly slants its reporting about Israel and Israeli policy. The left-wing Guardian and Independent newspapers regularly print accusatory, anti-Israel editorials, and their correspondents in Israel file biased, and occasionally false, reports. The supposedly prestigious BBC has long been a sounding board to trumpet Palestinian propaganda." In 2010 Ron Breiman, a former chairman of the right-wing organisation "Professors for a Strong Israel", claimed in one of Israel's leading newspapers, Haaretz, that the United Kingdom has raised and armed Israel's enemies in Jordan and the Arab Legion and described the British media as anti-Israeli.

Reacting to the UK government's decision to expel an Israeli diplomat because of Mossad's forging of 12 British passports for an assassination operation in 2010, former National Union members of the Israeli parliament Michael Ben-Ari and Aryeh Eldad accused the British government of being "anti-semitic" and referred to them as "dogs".

Spain

Anti-British sentiments evolved in Spain following the ceding of Gibraltar to the British through the Treaty of Utrecht in 1713 following the War of the Spanish Succession. In August 2013, Spain was considering forging an alliance with Argentina over the status of the Falkland Islands.

United States

President Thomas Jefferson complained of an unreasonable hostility towards the British state by the people in the United States during the Napoleonic Wars, brought about by the American Revolutionary War.

The anti-Tom novel Tit for Tat (written anonymously in 1856 by "A Lady of New Orleans") encouraged anti-British sentiment in reaction to Britain's positive reception of the anti-slavery novel Uncle Tom's Cabin by Harriet Beecher Stowe.

During the World War II alliance, anti-British sentiment took different forms. In May 1942, when conditions were highly problematic for British prospects, American journalist Edward R. Murrow privately gave a British friend an analysis of the sources of persistent anti-British sentiment in the United States. He attributed it especially to:
partly the hard-core of anglophobes (Irish, Germans and isolationists); partly the frustration produced by war without early victories; partly our bad behaviour at Singapore; and partly the tendency common to all countries at war to blame their allies for doing nothing.

Senior American military officers often tried, with little success, to push against Roosevelt's support for Britain. Fleet Admiral Ernest King had been noted for these views which affected his decision-making during the "Second Happy Time" (in the Battle of the Atlantic). Joseph Stilwell, a four-star general in the China, Burma and India theatre of the Second World War was another noted for anti British views (for example, in this diaries he wrote, "Boy, will this burn up the Limeys!" when Myitkyina was finally taken). Curiously, he got on well with British military commander William Slim, even volunteering to serve under him for a time rather than under George Giffard. Slim noted that Stilwell had a public persona that differed from his private relations.

In the 21st century, the Special Relationship between the United States and the United Kingdom has come under attack by advertising executive Steven A. Grasse who published The Evil Empire: 101 Ways That England Ruined the World, although this work is partly tongue in cheek and forms part of a larger media project launched by the author.

Roland Emmerich's 2000 movie The Patriot drew controversy for demonising the British army, and misrepresenting British forces depicted as engaging in savagery – such as the burning of a church with civilians inside – in the Thirteen Colonies during the American Revolution.  Liverpool City Council went on to claim that the film misrepresented British officer Banastre Tarleton and sought an apology from the producers. Other commentators noted that a similar incident was committed by German troops in the Oradour-sur-Glane massacre in World War II, and suggested that the film producers may have had, consciously or subconsciously, an anti-British agenda in changing the nationalities and relocating the event to an earlier and different conflict and one stated that it was similar to a "blood libel".

Derogatory terms
 "Britfag" (occasionally "Britbong") is often used on imageboards such as 4chan to refer to a British poster derogatively. The "-fag" in the former is a recurring suffix in 4chan terminology (ex. oldfag, newfag, Aussiefag). The "bong" in the latter refers to the chime of Big Ben.

In Spanish
"Piratas" (Pirates) is a derogatory term used in Argentina to refer to the British people. This term is mainly associated with the Falkland Islands dispute.

See also

 Anti-imperialism
 Anti-German sentiment
 Anti-Irish sentiment
 Anti-Russian sentiment
 Anti-Swedish Sentiment

References

Racism
 
British Discrimination
Racism in the United Kingdom